Anton Hrušecký  (2 January 1942 – 18 June 2019) was a former Slovak footballer, who played for FC Spartak Trnava. He earned 3 caps for the Czechoslovakia national football team.

International career
Hrušecký made three appearances for the full Czechoslovakia national football team.

References

External links

1942 births
2019 deaths
Czechoslovak footballers
Slovak footballers
Czechoslovakia international footballers
FC Spartak Trnava players
Czechoslovak football managers
Slovak football managers
FK Dukla Banská Bystrica managers

Association football midfielders
People from Galanta District
Sportspeople from the Trnava Region